Brian Clegg (born 1955) is an English science writer. He is the author of popular science books on topics including light, infinity, quantum entanglement and surviving the impact of climate change, and biographies of Roger Bacon and Eadweard Muybridge.

Biography

Born in Rochdale, Lancashire, Clegg was educated at Manchester Grammar School and went on to read Natural Science (specialising in experimental physics) at the University of Cambridge. After graduating, he spent a year at Lancaster University where he gained a second MA in Operational Research, a discipline originally developed during the Second World War to apply the power of mathematics to warfare. It has since been widely applied to problem solving and decision making in business.

From Lancaster, he joined British Airways, where he formed a new department tasked with providing all PC hardware, software and consultancy to the airline. When this was successfully running, he set up BA's Emerging Technologies Group, which researched and trialled technologies from fingerprint recognition to electronic cash. This emphasis on innovation led to training with Dr. Edward de Bono, and in 1994 he left BA to set up his own creativity consultancy, running courses on the development of new ideas and products, and the creative solution of business problems. His clients include the BBC, the Met Office, British Airways, GlaxoSmithKline, Sony, Royal Bank of Scotland and many other blue-chips.

Clegg is a regular speaker and has spoken at a range of venues, from Oxford and Cambridge universities to the Dana Centre at London's Science Museum. His book A Brief History of Infinity was launched with a sell-out lecture at the Royal Institution in London. He is also a regular contributor to both radio and TV programmes and writes regular columns, features and reviews for numerous magazines and newspapers, including PC Week, Computer Weekly, Personal Computer World, BBC History Magazine, Good Housekeeping, Chemistry World, Physics World, Nature, Playboy, The Wall Street Journal, The Times, The Observer and House Beautiful.

Clegg's 'Ecologic' won the 2009 IVCA Clarion Award, while 'A Brief History of Infinity' and 'Dice World' have been on the longlist for the Royal Society's book prize. In 2013, he was featured as a question on the BBC quiz show University Challenge and also appeared in the Christmas edition of the show, representing Lancaster University alongside actor Roger Ashton-Griffiths, presenter Ranvir Singh and food writer Matthew Fort.

His book, Are Numbers Real?: the Uncanny Relationship between Maths and the Physical World, was published by Robinson on 2 February 2017.It was published by St. Martin's Press in December 2016 in the United States. Publishers Weekly calls it an "entertaining and accessible look at the numbers we take for granted every day." Kirkus Reviews states: "Solid as a straightforward chronology of how mathematics has developed over time, and the author adds a provocative note urging scientists to keep it in its place."

Clegg lives in Wiltshire with his wife and twin children.

Science books

 UK edition: 

 new edition:

References

External links
 Brian Clegg's website
 Brian Clegg's blog
 Feynman got it wrong article by Clegg on Roger Bacon's place in the history of science
 Interview with Brian Clegg on Keeper of the Snails
 Brian Clegg at Library of Congress Authorities – with 30 catalogue records

1955 births
Living people
People from Rochdale
English science writers
People educated at Manchester Grammar School
Alumni of Lancaster University
Alumni of Bowland College, Lancaster
Alumni of Selwyn College, Cambridge